Frutos María Martínez (born 21 January 1959) is a Spanish sculptor and painter. He lives and works in Alicante, Spain.

Biography 
Frutos María Martínez was born in Hontoria de Valdearados, in the province of Burgos, Spain. He began sculpting and painting from an early age, building his own toys and gimmicks, thus showcasing an artisting inclination and interest in manual tasks.

At the age of 10, he began selling his creations and decorative objects in his immediate circle. Later, at the age of 15 he became a student at the "La Sindical", a trade school in Aranda de Duero where he specializes in "Industrial Mastery" with emphasis on metallurgy.

In 1986, at the age of 27, Frutos moved with his family to Alicante, Valencia, where he met Juan Guardiola Gaya, an architect and plastic artist who became his mentor. Guardiola Gaya introduced Frutos to the circle of artists, galleries and exhibitions of Alicante.

Work 
The artistic style and trajectory of Frutos María Martínez is marked by an environmental concern with a focus on the pollution and damage caused by discarded garbage in the ecosystems of the seas and oceans

"Many things are thrown into the sea that should not end up there, and we have to be aware that it is bad for wildlife, as well as humans. I make works of art out of rusty metal sheets and tarpaulins, for example."

This concern drives Frutos to collect materials such as wood, iron, stone, lead, cork, resins, sand and natural pigments from the coast of the Mediterranean Sea, which he uses to create his works. He made his first collective exhibition in 2008, and since then he has carried out numerous collective and individual exhibitions, working with both sculpture and painting.

Awards 
Frutos María is the author of the award handed to the winners of the "Importantes" Prize. It is a piece called "Armonía Vertical", or "Vertical Harmony" made of solid forged iron with a welded base, oxidation and patina finish.

Exhibits

Solo Exhibitions

Collective Exhibitions

Personal life
Frutos currently resides in Alicante with his wife of more than 35 years Ana, and their three children, Miguel, Paula and Julián.

References 

1959 births
21st-century Spanish painters
20th-century Spanish painters
21st-century Spanish sculptors
20th-century Spanish sculptors
Living people
People from Alicante
People from Burgos